The O-methylated flavonoids or methoxyflavonoids are flavonoids with methylations on hydroxyl groups (methoxy bonds). O-methylation has an effect on the solubility of flavonoids.

Enzymes
O-methylated flavonoids formation implies the presence of specific O-methyltransferase (OMT) enzymes which accept a variety of substrates. Those enzymes mediate the O-methylation on a specific hydroxyl group, like on 4' (example in Catharanthus roseus) or 3' (example in rice) positions. Those positions can be ortho, meta, para and there can be a special 3-O-methyltransferase for the 3-OH position. Calamondin orange (Citrus mitis) exhibits all of those activities.

Plant enzymes
 Apigenin 4'-O-methyltransferase
 8-hydroxyquercetin 8-O-methyltransferase
 Isoflavone 4'-O-methyltransferase
 Isoflavone 7-O-methyltransferase
 Isoliquiritigenin 2'-O-methyltransferase
 Isoorientin 3'-O-methyltransferase
 Kaempferol 4'-O-methyltransferase
 Luteolin O-methyltransferase
 Methylquercetagetin 6-O-methyltransferase
 3-methylquercetin 7-O-methyltransferase
 Myricetin O-methyltransferase
 Quercetin 3-O-methyltransferase
 Vitexin 2"-O-rhamnoside 7-O-methyltransferase

Animal enzyme
 Catechol-O-methyl transferase

O-methylated anthocyanidins
 5-Desoxy-malvidin
 Capensinidin
 Europinidin
 Hirsutidin
 Malvidin
 Peonidin
 Petunidin
 Pulchellidin
 Rosinidin

O-methylated flavanols
 Meciadanol (3-O'methyl catechin)

O-methylated flavanones
 Hesperetin
 Homoeriodictyol
 Isosakuranetin
 Sakuranetin
 Sterubin

O-methylated flavanonols
 Dihydrokaempferide

O-methylated flavonols
of kaempferol
 Kaempferide
of myricetin
 Annulatin
 Combretol
 Europetin
 Laricitrin (3'-O-Dimethylmyricetin)
 5-O-methylmyricetin
 Syringetin (3',5'-O-Dimethylmyricetin)
of quercetin
 Ayanin
 Azaleatin
 Isorhamnetin
 Ombuin
 Pachypodol
 Retusin (quercetin-3,7,3',4'-tetramethyl ether)
 Rhamnazin
 Rhamnetin
 Tamarixetin 
other
 Eupatolitin
 Natsudaidain

O-methylated flavones
 Acacetin
 Chrysoeriol
 Diosmetin
 Nepetin
 Nobiletin
 Oroxylin-A
 Sinensetin
 Tangeritin
 Thevetiaflavone
 Wogonin

O-methylated isoflavones
 Biochanin A
 Calycosin
 Formononetin
 Glycitein
 Irigenin
 5-O-methylgenistein
 Pratensein
 Prunetin
 Psi-tectorigenin
 Retusin
 Tectorigenin

See also
 C-methylated flavonoid

References

 
O-methylation